Soranik Natu is a fictional character, current leader of the Sinestro Corps, and a former member of the Green Lantern Corps in the . She first appears in Green Lantern Corps: Recharge #1 (November 2005), and was created by writers Geoff Johns, Dave Gibbons, and artist Patrick Gleason. 

Soranik is an extraterrestrial from the planet Korugar, and a Green Lantern successor of Katma Tui. She has been revealed as a daughter of the villain Sinestro, and her mother is Sinestro's late wife Arin Sur (Green Lantern Corps Vol. 2 #35, April 2009), which makes her the niece of Hal Jordan's predecessor, Abin Sur. Soranik was also the love interest of Green Lantern Kyle Rayner before ending the relationship after uncovering his continued affections for his deceased former love interest Jade.

Fictional character biography

Pre-Green Lantern background
A neurosurgeon by trade, Natu, like the rest of her race, saw the Green Lanterns and everything associated with them as a symbol of oppression because the first Korugaran to have been a Green Lantern was the renegade Sinestro. Sinestro, unbeknownst to his superiors, the Guardians of the Universe who recruit members of and administrate the Green Lantern Corps, used his power ring to enslave his people and rule over them as a dictator. As a result, he is known among Korugarans as "The Wicked". Although Sinestro’s crimes were eventually exposed to the Guardians by Earth's Green Lantern Hal Jordan and he was imprisoned as a result, the Green Lantern power ring and logo became symbols of evil. When another Korugaran, Katma Tui, subsequently became a Green Lantern, this did nothing to restore the Green Lanterns' image. Rather, Tui was seen as a monster by her own people for allying herself with the Corps, even after she eventually gave her life in the line of duty, and is known among the Korugarans as "The Lost".

The Corps suffered devastation when the demonic parasitic entity known as Parallax took control of Hal Jordan, turning him into a psychotic mass-murderer, and killing almost all the other members of the Corps including all the Guardians but one, Ganthet. The ranks of the Guardians were eventually restored by Jordan's replacement, Kyle Rayner, and after the Parallax entity was removed from Jordan and Jordan restored as a Green Lantern, the Guardians set about to repopulate the ranks of the Corps, searching for 7,200 new Green Lanterns. When Tarkus Whin, the Green Lantern of Space Sector 1417 (of which Korugar is also a part) was killed on his first day as a Green Lantern after Star 196 collapsed into a black hole, his ring sought out a replacement and found Dr. Natu in the middle of delicate neurosurgery on her home planet, Korugar.

Green Lantern of Korugar
Natu was horrified at the appearance of the ring and rejected it, but when her patient’s condition immediately began to worsen before her, Natu, desperate to save him, takes it. She uses it to conjure an elaborate medical apparatus that saved him, though her comrades in the operating room felt that by accepting the ring, she has damned herself. Although she allows the ring to take her to the planet Oa, which serves as the headquarters of the Guardians, she soon left, refusing to be inducted. However, on her way back to Korugar, she is haunted by thoughts of Tarkus Whin, because the rites of death are sacred on Korugar. Her ring takes her to the black hole that had been star 1417.196, which sucks her in as it had Whin. She finds herself somewhere devoid of light, along with Whin's body.

Sensing Whin's killers and realizing they are able to defeat a ringbearer, Natu swallows her ring. She orders it to alter her body so she appears to be a lump of dead matter to the nearby spider-killers. The ring is also programmed to react to other rings. Fellow Lanterns Kyle Rayner and Guy Gardner rescue Natu and convince her to stay in the Corps.

Natu, Rayner, and Gardner rendezvous with Corps trainer Kilowog and new recruits Vath Sarn and Isamot Kol. It is learned that the recent rash of stars collapsing into black holes is caused by the subspace web created by the inhabitants of the Vega star system known as the Spider Guild.

Natu demonstrates powerful emotional control against the mechanical spiders and many bounty hunters. She works past the Parallax Fear Anomaly, which makes Green Lantern power rings ineffective against anything yellow during times of fear or panic, until and unless the Lantern can muster his or her courage. With her fellow Green Lanterns’ power rings depleted in power, it fell to Natu to save them, which she did by encasing them all in an energy sphere and retreating from the Spider Guild’s nest. Natu and a small grouping of other Lanterns defeat the Guild's attempt to destroy Oa's sun.

Eventually, Natu realized that not all Green Lanterns are as corrupt as Sinestro as her people believed, but feels that her ring, which once belonged to Sinestro, is tainted by his evil.

In Infinite Crisis #7 (June 2006), Natu participates in the defense of Oa from the murderous attacks of Superboy-Prime. She helps form the wall of emerald energy that slows the rampaging teen. She arrives on the planet Mogo in time to assist in destroying the kryptonite threatening the life of Superman.

"One Year Later"
As of the "One Year Later" timeframe, Natu has completed her training and become an active member of the Corps. After seeking advice from Mogo, she elects to return to her homeworld and continue her work as a surgeon along with her Green Lantern duties. This has met with considerable resistance from her former colleagues, who find her use of the Green Lantern power offensive. After using her power ring in a surgery room again, she is forbidden to practice medicine on her home planet forever. Soon after, she is evicted from her home, her things thrown into the street. She burns her old belongings, proclaiming that Korugar had already killed Soranik Natu, and left her home in tears.

Natu is forced into living on the streets. However, after using her ring to surgically save a dying homeless man, the poor underclass of Korugar begins coming to her for medical help. While happy with this development, Natu is uncomfortable when the people begin championing her as their savior and using her as a symbol for revolution against the planet's elite.

"Sinestro Corps War"
During the "Sinestro Corps War" storyline, Sinestro himself returns to Korugar to confront his successor, Soranik Natu. Sinestro defeats her but spares her life, calculating that this will force her to stay on Korugar to fulfill her responsibilities as "the Savior of Korugar" and keep the planet safe until he returns. Sinestro then returns to Qward to join the battle occurring there. The people of Korugar, believing that Natu repelled Sinestro herself, begin holding her in higher regard.

Soranik Natu came to Earth to aid her fellow Green Lanterns participating in the events of the Sinestro Corps War. She confronts the Anti-Monitor along with Sodam Yat and witnesses his transformation into the new Ion entity. She acts as field medic for the Corps during the battle in New York City, saving Guy Gardner when he was infected by the sentient virus Despotellis. Natu injects him with a syringe containing Leezle Pon, a fellow Corps member and smallpox virus. After the war's end, Soranik was seen on Oa, fitting an injured Lantern with a mechanical limb. Later, she is instrumental in the defeat and capture of Sinestro Corps member Kryb. Following this, Natu and Rayner express their mutual romantic interest in each other.

Parentage
During the events of the "Emerald Eclipse" storyline, Soranik makes her way to Korugar to talk to her people about why Sinestro was not killed (in the Rage of the Red Lanterns storyline). After her speech to her people, Sinestro appears and reveals to her that he is Soranik's father.

Natu does not believe Sinestro, but he tells her a convincing story of her parentage. Shortly after her birth, Sinestro came to the conclusion that the disorganized and chaotic world of Korugar was not the kind of place that he wanted to raise his daughter and began his crusade to bring order to his people by force with his powers as a Green Lantern. As he began his rise to power, Sinestro and his wife Arin Sur (who is the sister of Abin Sur) began arguing about what he was doing. That, coupled with the numerous threats that were made against Sinestro and his family, caused his wife to leave with Soranik. The young girl was then left in the care of Karoll and Dgibb Natu, the former being the obstetrician who delivered Soranik. Soranik would adopt their surname and come to believe they were her parents.

Initially, Sinestro had trouble locating his daughter and assumed that it was for the best. However, he did eventually locate her and used his ring to leave a mark on her face whilst she slept. The mark, shaped like his family's coat of arms (the two downward pointed triangles underneath her left eye), contained a micro transmitter that would enable him to find her easily from then on. Sinestro then said he visited Soranik occasionally, sometimes in disguise, even during Soranik's graduation from medical school (where he took a photo of Soranik and her adopted parents for them). Sinestro concludes his story by telling Soranik that he was proud of her and everything she has accomplished, namely succeeding where he failed by bringing order to Korugar. Sinestro then tells her that despite how she feels about him, they must work together to stop the Blackest Night event (which occurred in the storyline of the same name), also warning her of the Green Lantern Corps' long-time enemy, Atrocitus, and his Red Lantern Corps, who would try to find her to seek revenge against Sinestro. Realizing that Sinestro was telling the truth, Soranik later tries to remove the mark on her face using a laser construct created by her ring to destroy the evidence of her relationship with her despotic father but fails, thus leaving her a bitter reminder. The only other Corps member aware of this fact is Iolande.

"Blackest Night" and "Brightest Day"
In the "Blackest Night" storyline, while on their way back to Oa, Soranik and Iolande meet up with Guy Gardner and Kyle Rayner. The group are then passed by a swarm of black power rings. The rings enter Oa's Green Lantern crypt and transform all the corpses within into Black Lanterns who promptly attack the living Lanterns. As the battle rages on, Soranik and Iolande make a stand in the Oan infirmary, desperately trying to defend the wounded from the Black Lanterns' assault. Eventually realizing that they could not fight and defend the patients at the same time, Soranik uses her ring to transport all the patients to Mogo, with Iolande providing an escort. Soranik then assists Kyle against his former love, Jade. Soranik tries to dismiss Jade's various taunts but is enraged when Jade says that Soranik will meet the same fate as all of Kyle's lovers. Soranik then shoves her fist into Jade's mouth and powers up her ring. Their confrontation is interrupted by the announcement that the Black Lanterns' power levels have reached one hundred percent. Jade and the other Black Lanterns then proceed to attempt to devour the Central Power Battery. When the Alpha Lantern Chaselon is attacked by the Black Lanterns, his internal battery is damaged. Soranik watches in horror as Kyle sacrifices himself to shield the Green Lanterns from the resulting explosion.

As Soranik attempts to resuscitate Kyle, Guy is consumed with rage over Kyle's death. Vice's Red Lantern ring manifests itself and Guy takes it, transforming into a Red Lantern. As he battles the Black Lanterns, Soranik tries to fight off a black ring that attaches itself to Kyle and attempts to resurrect him, but Munk of the Indigo Tribe destroys it before it can. He and the rest of the Green Lantern Corps defend her and Kyle's body from the swarm of black rings around them. Miri Riam of the Star Sapphires arrives, having sensed the true love between Kyle and Soranik in jeopardy. Riam uses her ring's power to connect Soranik's heart to Kyle's and combines their power of will together with her power of love, successfully restoring Kyle to life. Sensing this, his ring returns to him. At the end of the incident, Jade is one of the dozen heroes and villains restored to life by the white light. She promptly kisses Kyle, leaving Soranik to watch in shock.

In the "Brightest Day" storyline, the follow-up "Blackest Night", Jade, acknowledging that Kyle moved on following her death, and is in love with Natu, says she will not interfere with their relationship. Natu is later abducted by the Qwardian Weaponer who made Sinestro's original yellow ring, forcing Kyle to contact Sinestro for aid in rescuing his daughter, thus eventually the revelation of her true parentage.

"War of the Green Lanterns"

During the 2011 storyline "War of the Green Lanterns" storyline, Natu, like the rest of the Corps, falls under the control of Krona after he infects the central power battery with Parallax, although Hal, John, Kyle and Guy are able to resist Krona's influence due to their past conflict with Parallax long enough to don new rings. In the final battle, Natu and the Green Lantern Corps are freed from Parallax's control-emotions and preparation for the final confrontation with Krona. Afterwards, Natu's anger at her temporary control is made worse by her anger at Sinestro's return to the Green Lantern Corps, with things becoming even worse when Kyle admits that his encounter with the Star Sapphires actually showed him Jade rather than Natu; he only said that he had seen Natu because Jade was dead and he did not want to live in the past. Even so, she felt betrayed and left him in a somewhat calm fashion.

"The New 52" and "DC Rebirth"
In The New 52, like most Green Lanterns, Soranik was largely unchanged; she remained a Lantern in good standing throughout the Rise of the Third Army and Wrath of the First Lantern. Shortly after the events of Forever Evil, Soranik was taken prisoner by the Sinestro Corps under Arkillo's leadership.  Upon Sinestro's return to the Yellow Lantern Corps, he released Soranik from custody and installed her as the Green Lantern Ambassador to the Sinestro Corps.

Just before the loss of the Green Lantern Corps, Soranik is stripped of her Green Lantern ring by Sinestro and made a Yellow Lantern. She is subsequently partnered with new recruit Nax of the Naidroth Collective, a fellow surgeon with a unique gift that she calls "psychic vivisection" – the ability to pull bodies apart and put them back together again, which is agonizingly painful for those not sedated.

In the 2014 series The New 52: Futures End, Soranik has become a full-fledged member of the Sinestro Corps.

After the defeat of her father by Hal Jordan, Soranik became the leader of the Sinestro Corps. Soranik forged an alliance and partnership with the Green Lantern Corps. However, that alliance fell apart after the death of Sarko, a villain from the future who had been defeated by the two Corps. Sarko was, in fact, her future son with Kyle Rayner—and Kyle had kept Sarko's relationship from her upon discovering it himself. She broke off her relationship with him as a result, and gather all the Yellow Lanterns for vengeance. Soranik broke the alliance and left Mogo, proclaiming herself Soranik Sinestro in Hal Jordan and the Green Lantern Corps #25.

Reception
Soranik Natu has been called "one of the most interesting new members of the Green Lantern Corps" due to being both a Green Lantern and a doctor, and she has been the subject of analysis of potential conflicts between the Green Lantern oath and the Hippocratic Oath.

In other media

Television
Soranik Natu appears in the Young Justice episode "Rescue and Search", voiced by Vanessa Marshall.

Miscellaneous
 Soranik Natu appears in Smallville Season 11.
 Soranik appears in issue #16 of DC Universe Online: Legends.
 Soranik appears in the Injustice 2 prequel comic as the warden of the planet Harring and estranged daughter of Sinestro.

References

Characters created by Dave Gibbons
Characters created by Geoff Johns
Comics characters introduced in 2005
DC Comics aliens
DC Comics extraterrestrial superheroes
DC Comics female superheroes
Fictional surgeons
Green Lantern Corps officers
Superheroes who are adopted